Takada (written:  lit. "high ricefield") is a Japanese surname. Notable people with the surname include:

Junji Takada, Japanese comedian
, Japanese video game music composer
Minayoshi Takada, Japanese photographer
Miwa Takada, Japanese actress
Nobuhiko Takada, Japanese mixed martial artist
, Japanese footballer and referee
, Japanese shot putter
, Japanese shogi player
, Japanese swimmer
, Japanese voice actress

Fictional characters
Kiyomi Takada, character in the manga series Death Note

Japanese-language surnames